This is a list of members of the Tasmanian Legislative Council between 1927 and 1933. Terms of the Legislative Council did not coincide with Legislative Assembly elections, and members served six year terms, with a number of members facing election each year.

Elections

Members

Notes
  On 1 August 1927, Tetley Gant, the member for Buckingham, retired. Thomas Murdoch, who had lost his Hobart seat a few months earlier, won the resulting by-election on 20 September 1927.

Sources
 
 Parliament of Tasmania (2006). The Parliament of Tasmania from 1856

Members of Tasmanian parliaments by term
20th-century Australian politicians